Akanwali is a village in Tohana Tehsil in Fatehabad district of Haryana, India. It belongs to Hisar Division.

Akanwali is located 38 kilometers east from the district headquarters of Fatehabad. 176 km from the state capital of Chandigarh. Akanwali's Pin code is 125106 and postal head office is Dharsul Kalan. Bhodi, Laluwala, Dher, Hindalwala, and Diwana are nearby villages from Akanwali. Akanwali is surrounded by Jakhal Tehsil towards the north, Bhuna Tehsil towards the south, Ratia Tehsil towards west, Uklana Tehsil towards south. Tohana, Ratia, Narwana are the nearby cities to Akanwali. Agriculture and farming is the main source of income for people residing in this village.

Languages Spoken 
Punjabi is the main language of Akanwali. Hindi is also spoken by few people here.

Nearest Railway Stations 
 Jamalpur Sheikhan 7 km.
 Tohana 14 km.

Schools in Akanwali 
 Govt Senior Secondary School. 
 Primary School

Banks 
 State Bank Of India.
 Cooperative Kissan Bank

References 

Villages in Fatehabad district